Bianca de Oliveira Lima (born 27 August 1996) is a Brazilian badminton player.

Career 
Her partner is Naira Beatriz Vier. Both of them became the runner-up at the 2016 Brazil Open Grand Prix after defeated by the German pair Barbara Bellenberg and Eva Janssens in the final round.

Achievements

BWF Grand Prix 
The BWF Grand Prix has two levels, the BWF Grand Prix and Grand Prix Gold. It is a series of badminton tournaments sanctioned by the Badminton World Federation (BWF) since 2007.

Women's doubles

  BWF Grand Prix Gold tournament
  BWF Grand Prix tournament

BWF International Challenge/Series 
Women's singles

Women's doubles

  BWF International Challenge tournament
  BWF International Series tournament
  BWF Future Series tournament

References

External links 
 
 

1996 births
Living people
Brazilian female badminton players
21st-century Brazilian women